Early Autumn is a Spenser novel by Robert B. Parker. Spenser is hired to protect a boy, Paul Giacomin, from being kidnapped in a custody quarrel. He ends up taking care of the boy, who is socially immature, having been ignored by his parents, only used as a pawn in their quarrelling.  Spenser takes him in and helps him mature through learning to box, exercising, weight-lifting and building a cottage. At the same time, with the help of Hawk, he collects enough information about the parents that they leave the boy alone and let Spenser unofficially adopt him.

Literary Allusions

"Elementary, my dear Watson, elementary." p.19 
Arthur Conan Doyle, Sherlock Holmes Series

"Join a gang of pickpockets and live in the slums of London?" p. 25 Charles Dickens, Oliver Twist

"Make a raft and float down the Mississippi?" p.26
Mark Twain, The Adventures of Huckleberry Finn

Paul Giacomin goes on to appear in several later Spenser novels, usually as a minor character.

References

1980 American novels
Spenser (novel series)